The application Barcode Scanner is an Android app, from the open-source project ZXing (short for Zebra Crossing), that allows an Android device with imaging hardware (a built-in camera) to scan barcodes or 2D barcodes and retrieve the data encoded. Information encoded often includes web addresses, geographical coordinates, and small pieces of text, in addition to commercial product codes. This Android-based system has similar functionality to a hardware barcode reader.

This application supports many different types of barcodes, including those used to identify products in commerce. The Barcode Scanner can automatically search the Web to identify a product with a barcode and use, for example, price-comparison information between vendors.

The application can decode several 2D barcodes including the widely used QR Code and Data Matrix. QR codes are often embedded in websites; Barcode Scanner can open a browser at the encoded site, for example, facilitating the download of an application.

, this is one of the most downloaded Android applications as listed by Google Play, with over 600,000 ratings and over 126 million user installs.

Detection performance of ZXing was assessed on close to 2 million synthetic images for three types of barcodes: QR Code, MaxiCode, and EAN-13 1D barcode. Problematic angles where decoding often fails were found,  for example 45, 135, 225 and 315 degrees for QR Codes.

See also
 Automated identification and data capture (AIDC)
 Barcode printer
 Code (disambiguation)
 European Article Numbering-Uniform Code Council
 Global Trade Item Number
 Identifier
 Inventory control system
 List of most downloaded Android applications
 Object hyperlinking
 Semacode
 SMS barcode
 SPARQCode

References

External links
 Development Site
 
 

Automatic identification and data capture
Barcodes
Free and open-source Android software